Tauberrettersheim is a municipality in the district of Würzburg in Bavaria, Germany. It lies on the river Tauber.

Notable residents
Isidor Grunfeld, 1900–1975; Rabbi

References

Würzburg (district)